Jonas Ueland Kolstad (born 21 September 1976) is a former Norwegian football goalkeeper who currently goalkeeping coach for Bodø/Glimt.

He got 15 youth caps for Norway. In 2015, he became goalkeeper coach for Bodø/Glimt after Tor Arne Aga became director for Bodø HK.

In 2020, after injury to 3rd choice keeper Marcus Andersen and Joshua Smits being quarantine after signing a contract on 12 June 2020. Kolstad became the backup keeper for Bodø/Glimt first game of the season.

Career statistics

References

External links
Profile at Bodo/Glimt club website
100% Fotball - Norwegian Premier League statistics

1976 births
Living people
Sportspeople from Bodø
Norwegian footballers
Norway youth international footballers
Association football goalkeepers
FK Bodø/Glimt players
Drøbak-Frogn IL players
Norwegian First Division players
Eliteserien players